Eva Susanne Julia Haacke (born 2 September 1971 in Munich) is a German actress and voice actress.

Selected filmography
 1994 Verfolger
 1995 Nur über meine Leiche
 1997 Verbotene Liebe (Kerstin Richter)
 1997 Wildbach
 2000 Lexx – The Dark Zone: Tales from a Parallel Universe
 2000 
 2000 St. Angela: Horrornacht und Partyfieber
 2001 
 2006 Sturm der Liebe
 2011 Verbotene Liebe (Kerstin Richter)
 2011 Princess Lillifee and the Little Unicorn

Voice acting
Among other roles, Haacke dubbed Jennie Garth in Beverly Hills, 90210, Eliza Dushku in Bring it On and Izabella Miko in Coyote Ugly.

In anime, she played the German language roles of Rei Hino (Sailor Mars) in Sailor Moon, Kodachi in Ranma ½ and Shippō in InuYasha, One Piece (TV) as Miss Father's Day, Princess Sara as Lavinia, Miyuki as Miyuki Wakamatsu, and many others.

References

External links

 Deutschen Synchronkartei
 Julia Haacke (alias Hexana)

1971 births
German television actresses
German voice actresses
Living people
Actresses from Munich